The human gene VKORC1 encodes for the enzyme,  Vitamin K epOxide Reductase Complex (VKORC) subunit 1. This enzymatic protein complex is responsible for reducing vitamin K 2,3-epoxide to its active form, which is important for effective clotting (coagulation). In humans, mutations in this gene can be associated with deficiencies in vitamin-K-dependent clotting factors.

Function 
The VKORC1 protein is a key enzyme in the vitamin K cycle. VKORC1 is a 163 amino acid integral membrane protein associated with the endoplasmic reticulum and VKORC1 mRNA is broadly expressed in many different tissues. VKORC1 is involved in the vitamin K cycle by reduction of vitamin K epoxide to vitamin K, which is the rate-limiting step in the physiological process of vitamin K recycling. The availability of reduced vitamin K is of importance for activation vitamin K 2,3-epoxide. The reduction of vitamin K epoxide is then responsible for the carboxylation of glutamic acid residues in some blood-clotting proteins, including factor VII, factor IX, and factor X. VKORC1 is of therapeutic interest both for its role in contributing to high interpatient variability in coumarin anticoagulant dose requirements and as a potential player in vitamin K deficiency disorders.

Warfarin is a commonly prescribed oral anticoagulant, or blood thinner used to treat blood clots such as deep vein thrombosis and pulmonary embolism and to prevent stroke in people who have atrial fibrillation, valvular heart disease or artificial heart valves. Warfarin causes inhibition on VKORC1 activities and leads to a reduced amount of vitamin K available to serve as a cofactor for clotting proteins. Inappropriate dosing of warfarin has been associated with a substantial risk of both major and minor hemorrhage. As the pharmacological target of warfarin, VKORC1 is considered a candidate gene for the variability in warfarin response. Previous researches have shown that the CYP2C9 genotype of patients also played a role in warfarin metabolism and response.

Gene 
The human gene is located on chromosome 16. Two pseudogenes have been identified on chromosome 1 and the X chromosome.

Clinical relevance 

In humans, mutations in this gene are associated with deficiencies in vitamin-K-dependent clotting factors. Fatal bleeding (internal) and hemorrhage can result from a decreased ability to form clots.

The product of the VKORC1 gene encodes a subunit of the enzyme that is responsible for reducing vitamin K 2,3-epoxide to the activated form, a reduction reaction. A genetic polymorphism on the VKORC1 gene results in a patient having less available VKORC enzyme to complete this reaction.

Specifically, in the VKORC1 1639 (or 3673) single-nucleotide polymorphism, the common ("wild-type") G allele is replaced by the A allele. People with an A allele (or the "A haplotype") produce less VKORC1 than do those with the G allele (or the "non-A haplotype"). The prevalence of these variants also varies by race, with 90–95% of Asians, 37% of Caucasians and 14% of Africans carrying the A allele. The end result is a decreased amount of clotting factors and therefore, a decreased ability to clot.

Warfarin is an anticoagulant that opposes the procoagulant effect of vitamin K by inhibiting the VKORC enzyme. If these patients are prescribed warfarin for another medical purpose, they will require lower doses than usual because the patient is already deficient in VKORC. They may experience severe bleeding and bruising. Lower warfarin doses are needed to inhibit VKORC1 and to produce an anticoagulant effect in carriers of the A allele. Genetic testing can reveal the presence of the genetic mutation and FDA recommends lower starting doses of warfarin in these patients.

Two alternatively spliced transcripts encoding different isoforms have also been described. These isoforms result in warfarin resistance (requiring higher doses) in humans and rats, because the amount and effectiveness of the VKORC enzyme has not changed, but the ability of warfarin to exert its effect (antagonize the enzyme) has changed. These isoform mutations are rare except in Ethiopian and certain Jewish populations.

References

Further reading